The Ambassador of Ireland to the People's Republic of China is the official representative of the Government of Ireland to the Government of the People's Republic of China and the head of the Embassy of Ireland, Beijing.

History
Ireland established diplomatic relations with China in 1979 and opened its embassy in Beijing in May 1980.

List of representatives

 1980–1983: 
 1983–1987: Dermot Waldron
 1987–1991: Gearoid O'Broin
 1991–1995: Thelma Doran
 1995–1999: Joe Hayes
 1999–2004: Declan Connolly
 2004–2013: Declan Kelleher
 2013–2017: Paul Kavanagh
 2017–2020: Eoin O'Leary
 2021–present: Ann Derwin

References 

Ambassadors of Ireland to China
China
Ireland